Phnom Penh International Airport  is the busiest and largest airport in Cambodia, occupying a land area of 386.5 hectares.

History
Phnom Penh airport's former name was Pochentong International Airport. The name of Pochentong International Airport was derived from the leader of the Kuomintang Cambodian branch, Po Chentong.

On 6 July 1995, the Royal Government of Cambodia (RGC) signed a concession agreement with the French–Malaysian joint venture company Société Concessionaire d'Aéroport (SCA), to operate Phnom Penh (PNH) – Pochentong International Airport. In return for a 20-year concession, SCA—70 per cent owned by Groupe GTM and 30 per cent by Muhibbah Masterron of Malaysia—committed to a $100 million improvement program that includes the construction of a new runway, terminal and cargo buildings, hangars, installation of a Cat III level Instrument Landing System (ILS) and associated approach lighting. The Berger Group was selected by the RGC to provide independent engineering services during the concession, to audit the design and to advise on the practicality and cost of the concession's proposed improvements. The Berger team also supervised the initial works to accommodate widebody aircraft such as 747s, including asphalt concrete runway overlays; installation of new ILS, metrological equipment, runway lighting and generator and power systems; and construction of a new fire station, taxiway and turn-pad extensions. Following the successful completion of the initial works, the Berger team provided design review and independent engineering services for the construction of a new  terminal building to accommodate growing tourist traffic. The $20 million terminal building includes four mobile aerobridges, over 1000 auto parking spaces and VIP and CIP facilities.

Over 30 years after withdrawing from Phnom Penh due to the Cambodian Civil War, Air France returned in March 2011. Using Airbus A340s, the carrier introduced flights to Paris via Bangkok. The stopover later changed to Ho Chi Minh City. However, the route lasted only two years.

Facilities

Overview
The airport has two terminal buildings – one for international and one for domestic operations. Recently, it added a new facility for VIP service. The international terminal has four aerobridges built in 2003. Three more aerobridges were added during the passenger terminal expansion in 2016–2017. The airport's design capacity is 5 million people per year.

Expansion
In 2014, Cambodia Airports announced a $100 million project to expand the passenger terminals at Phnom Penh and Siem Reap international airports to accommodate continued strong passenger growth. The project saw the extension of the parking lots and terminals, more check-in and immigration counters, and new baggage handling systems. Additionally, the commercial areas were enlarged to allow for more retail shops, new restaurants and food and beverage outlets, and mezzanine lounges to cater to first class and business travellers. The expansions will allow the airport to double its capacity to handle 5 million passengers a year from 2.5 million passengers.

Airlines and destinations

Passenger

Cargo

Statistics

Ground transportation 

There are a few options to transfer to or from Phnom Penh International Airport and the city. Outside the arrival hall, passengers can take a taxi provided by the Airport Taxi Association or book a ride from Grab, a ride-hailing app. In April 2018, trains operated by Royal Railway Cambodia began running express from Phnom Penh International Airport (parking area) to Phnom Penh Railway Station (City Center). Trains run every 30 minutes and the journey takes roughly 30 minutes, fare of one-way is US$2.50. There is also the city bus and an airport express bus.

Accidents and incidents
 On 3 December 1973, Douglas DC-3 XW-PHV of Air Union was reported to have crashed shortly after take-off.
 On 19 January 1975, Douglas C-47A XU-HAK, Douglas DC-3 XU-KAL of Khmer Hansa and Douglas C-47A N86AC of South East Asia Air Transport were all destroyed in a rocket attack on the airport.
 On 22 February 1975, Douglas C-47A XU-GAJ of Khmer Hansa was damaged beyond economic repair in a rocket attack.
 On 10 March 1975, a Douglas DC-3 of Samaki Airlines was damaged beyond economic repair in a rocket attack.
 On 11 March 1975, a Douglas DC-3 of Khmer Hansa was damaged beyond economic repair in a rocket attack.
 In March 1975, Vickers Viscount XW-TDN of Royal Air Lao crashed at Phnom Penh International Airport. The pilot was not qualified to fly the aircraft. All four people on board were killed. ''Accident aircraft also reported as XW-TFK with a date of 15 March.
 On 11 April 1975, a Douglas DC-3 (possibly XW-PKT) of Sorya Airlines was hit by shrapnel shortly after take-off. The aircraft was destroyed by fire and two of the three occupants were killed. The same day, Douglas C-47B XW-TFB of Air Cambodge was damaged beyond economic repair in a rocket attack.
 3 September 1997: Vietnam Airlines Flight 815, operated by a Tupolev Tu-134 crashed on approach to Pochentong Airport, killing 65 of the 66 passengers on board. The aircraft was entirely destroyed. The aircraft was flying from Ho Chi Minh City to Phnom Penh. The Tupolev was approaching the Phnom Penh airport runway in heavy rain from 2,000 meters; at this point the control tower ordered the pilot to attempt an approach from the west due to a wind pick-up. The crew then lost communication with the tower, and three minutes later the aircraft collided at low level with trees, damaging the left wing. The aircraft then slid 200 yards into a dry rice paddy before exploding. Pilot error was later identified as the cause of the crash; the pilot continued his landing descent from an altitude of 2,000 meters to 30 meters even though the runway was not in sight, and ignored pleas from his first officer and flight engineer to turn back. When the aircraft hit the trees, the pilot finally realized the runway was not in sight and tried to abort the approach; the flight engineer pushed for full power, but the aircraft lost control and veered left; the right engine then stalled, making it impossible to gain lift.

Future

In January 2018, the Cambodian government approved a proposal to build a new airport to serve Phnom Penh that will cost an estimated US$1.5 billion. The new international airport will replace the existing Phnom Penh International Airport, with initial plans having the facilities being constructed on partially reclaimed land adjacent to Boueng Cheung Loung, a large lake in Kandal Province about 30 kilometres south of Phnom Penh.

Cambodia Airport Investment, a joint venture 90 percent owned by Overseas Cambodia Investment Corporation (OCIC), one of the country's largest real estate developers, and 10 percent by the government's State Secretariat of Civil Aviation, plans to invest the $1.5 billion to construct the new airport. The OCIC will invest US$280 million, while unspecified "foreign banks" will provide US$1.1 billion in funding. The OCIC will own 90 per cent of the shares in the completed airport, with the rest going to the SSCA While the construction plans are still in the early stages of development, the 4F class airport will be capable of handling large long-haul aircraft and will reportedly cover an area of around 2,600 hectares, which would make it one of the largest airports in the world.

See also
 Siem Reap International Airport
 Sihanouk International Airport

References

Bibliography
 De Launey, Guy (6 February 2006). "Budget flights arrive in Southeast Asia", BBC.

External links

 Phnom Penh International Airport at Cambodia International Airports website
 
 

Airports in Cambodia
Airport
Airport